Chandrakant Amritlal Topiwala is a Gujarati language poet and critic from Gujarat, India.

Early life

Topiwala was born on 7 August 1936 at Vadodara, to Amritlal and Lilavati. He completed his Bachelor of Arts in Gujarati from the University of Bombay-affiliated Saint Xavier's College in 1958, and received his Masters in 1960. He completed his PhD in 1982 from Gujarat University.

Career
Topiwala taught Gujarati language at K H Madhvani College, Porbandar from 1961 to 1965. In 1965, he joined Navjivan Commerce and Arts College, Dahod as head of Department of Gujarati, and served as principal of the college from 1971 to 1984. Later he became the director of Kasturbhai Lalbhai Swadhyay Mandir, run by Gujarati Sahitya Parishad, Ahmedabad. He was the president of Parishad during 2016 to 2018.

Works

Poetry
Maheraman, his first poetry collection, was published in 1962, followed by Kant Tari Rani in 1971, which gained him critical acclaim. Pakshitirth (1988) is further experimental poetry. Black Forest (1989) was written during his visit to Europe and was influenced by European culture. Avagaman (1999) and Apani Kavyasamriddhi (2004) are his other works of poetry.

Criticism
Topiwala is considered a modernist critic. His first book, Aparichit A Aparichit B, was published in 1975 which has four sections. His collection Had Parna Hans Ane Albatross (1975) is a translation and criticism of French symbolist poetry. Madhyamala (1983) is a collection of articles on medieval Gujarati literature. Other publications include Pratibhasha nu Kavach (1984), San-sarjanatamak Kavya-vigyan (1985), Vivechanno Vibhajit Pat (1990), Granth Ghatna (1994) and Gujarati Sakshibhasya.

Translations
He has translated works of the Bohemian-Austrian poet Rainer Maria Rilke into Gujarati: Duino Elegies as Duino Karunikao (1976) and Sonnets to Orpheus as Orpheus Prati Sonneto (1977). He translated Samuel Beckett's short prose as Kalpo ke Kalpana Mari Parvari Chhe. He translated and published Contemporary Gujarati Poetry (1972) and Maithili Sahitya no Itihas (History of Maithili Literature, 1987) and Ishwarni Yatna (2004).

Other
Topiwala co-edited Adhunik Sahitya Sangnya-Kosh (1986), a Gujarati dictionary of literary terms. He also edited Vishishta Sahitya Sangnya-Kosh (1988), Gujarati Tunki Varta Kosh (1990), Anuadhunikatavad (1993), Pavan Pagathiya (2004). He also edited Jayant Khatrini Shreshth Vartao (1994).

Awards
He received a Ranjitram Suvarna Chandrak in 2002, Premanand Suvarna Chandrak in 2005, Anantrai Raval Criticism Award and a Sahitya Akademi Award for his critical study Gujarati Sakshibhasya in 2012. He was conferred a Samanvay Bhasha Samman award in 2013 for his contributions to literature.

See also
 List of Gujarati-language writers

References

External links

Modernist writers
Indian literary critics
1939 births
Living people
20th-century Indian poets
Gujarati-language writers
People from Vadodara district
Indian male poets
Recipients of the Sahitya Akademi Award in Gujarati
Poets from Gujarat
Recipients of the Ranjitram Suvarna Chandrak
20th-century Indian male writers